Zard castle is a historical castle located in Damghan County in Semnan Province, The longevity of this fortress dates back to the Historical periods after Islam.

References 

Castles in Iran